Queen of Spades: Through the Looking Glass – Part 2 is a 2019 Russian supernatural horror film directed by Aleksandr Domogarov Jr. It is based on the same urban legend as the 2015 horror film Queen of Spades: The Dark Rite. This time, the plot takes place in a boarding school, where a terrible otherworldly force embarks on a hunt for children. The film stars Angelina Strechina, Daniil Muravyev-Izotov, Claudia Boczar, Valeriy Pankov and Vladislav Konoplyov.

The film was released on March 14, 2019, in Russia by Walt Disney Studios Sony Pictures Releasing (WDSSPR).

Plot 
The film tells the story of students of an exclusive boarding school that recently opened in what had been an abandoned mansion. Visiting forbidden rooms, they learn that Countess Obolenskaya, the former owner of the mansion, had taken in and then killed 19 orphans, whose souls still inhabit the house.
Summoned as a game, the Queen of Spades now seeks to claim the living children as well.

Cast
 Angelina Strechina as Olya
 Daniil Muravyev-Izotov as Artyom, a boy
 Claudia Boczar as Countess Obolenskaya / Queen of Spades
 Valeriy Pankov as Igor Sergeevich
 Vladislav Konoplyov as Kirill 
 Vladimir Kanuhin as Zhenya
 Anastasia Talyzina as Alisa
 Alyona Shvidenkova as Sonya
 Darya Belousova as Valentina, school director
 Vladimir Koshevoy as Gleb, Kirill's father
  as investigator
 Tatyana Kuznetsova as Zhenya's grandmother
 Violetta Davydovskaya as Tatiana, Olya and Artyom's Mother
 Igor Yashanin as Gosha in childhood
 Yan Alabushev as Misha in childhood

Production

Filming
Principal photography began in May 2018. The main part of the filming took place in the operating sanatorium named after Herzen, located in the Odintsovsky District, Moscow Oblast.

Release 
Queen of Spades: Through the Looking Glass is scheduled to be released on March 14, 2019, in Russia by Walt Disney Studios Sony Pictures Releasing (WDSSPR), and was released in the United States on August 13, 2019.

Reception
The budget of the film amounted to 78 355 154 rubles, of which 50 million were allocated by the Cinema Foundation of Russia (35 million on an irrevocable basis and 15 million on a refundable basis). At the box office, the film failed, collecting a little more than its budget - 86 345 224 rubles. After the online edition of Mash reported that the Cinema Foundation allegedly demanded the return of the free subsidy, the RBK Group television channel contacted the press service of the fund for clarification.

See also
 Down a Dark Hall (2018 film)

References

External links 
 
 

2019 films
2010s Russian-language films
2019 horror films
2010s supernatural horror films
2010s teen horror films
Russian supernatural horror films
Russian sequel films
Russian coming-of-age films
Films about children
Films set in boarding schools